The 2004 Biathlon Junior World Championships was held in Haute Maurienne Vanoise, France from January 25 to January 31 2004. There was to be a total of 16 competitions: sprint, pursuit, individual, mass start, and relay races for men and women.

Medal winners

Youth Women

Junior Women

Youth Men

Junior Men

Medal table

References

External links
Official IBU website 

Biathlon Junior World Championships
2004 in biathlon
2004 in French sport
International sports competitions hosted by France
2004 in youth sport
January 2004 sports events in France